Farris is an unincorporated community in Hubbard County, in the U.S. state of Minnesota.

History
A post office called Graceland was established in 1887, the name was changed to Farris in 1898, and the post office closed in 1915. Farris was a station on the Great Northern and Soo railroads.

References

Former municipalities in Minnesota
Unincorporated communities in Hubbard County, Minnesota
Unincorporated communities in Minnesota